Amar Agrawal  (born 22 September 1963) is an Indian politician and former Cabinet Minister of Government of Chhattisgarh. He is a member of Bharatiya Janata Party.

Agrawal represented the legislature of Chhattisgarh from 1998 to 2018. After his victory in the 2013 Assembly elections,  Agrawal represented his constituency for the third successive tenure as Minister of Health and Medical Education in the Legislature Assembly of Chhattisgarh. There are a number of schemes and projects in which he is involved such as 108 Sanjeevani Express, 102 Mahtari Express, 104 Medical Consultation and Online Jan Shikayat Kendra.

Political career 
In 1998, Agrawal contested 1998 assembly election from Bilaspur Constituency and won by margin of 10,995 votes. After creation of Chhattisgarh out of Madhya Pradesh, he won 2003 Chhattisgarh Assembly election from same constituency and became Cabinet Minister in Raman Singh's Ministry and retained his constituency till 2018.

Agrawal held various portfolios such as Finance, Health and family welfare, commercial tax, revenue during his tenure from 2003 to 2018.

References

External links
 
 
 

Living people
State cabinet ministers of Chhattisgarh
1963 births
Chhattisgarh MLAs 2013–2018
Chhattisgarh MLAs 2000–2003
People from Raigarh district
People from Bilaspur, Chhattisgarh
Bharatiya Janata Party politicians from Chhattisgarh
Madhya Pradesh MLAs 1993–1998
Chhattisgarh MLAs 2003–2008
Chhattisgarh MLAs 2008–2013